Andrey Nikolayevich Aleksanenkov (born 27 March 1969) is a former Russian professional footballer.

Brief overview
Aleksanenkov is a graduate of the Dynamo Moscow football academy. He played for the main squad of FC Dynamo Moscow in the USSR Federation Cup. He made his professional debut in the Soviet Second League in 1988 for FC Dynamo-2 Moscow.

In his career Aleksanenkov played 44 games at the Ukrainian Higher League and 24 games at the Russian Higher League. He also accounted for a goal in the Ukrainian top division. Aleksanenkov also played 9 games for the Soviet side Dynamo Kyiv in the continental club competitions.

Honours
 Soviet Top League champion: 1990.
 Ukrainian Premier League champion: 1993, 1994, 1995.

European club competitions
 European Cup Winners' Cup 1990–91 with FC Dynamo Kyiv: 4 games.
 European Cup 1991–92 with FC Dynamo Kyiv: 5 games.
 UEFA Cup 1992–93 with FC Dynamo Kyiv: 1 game.
 UEFA Intertoto Cup 1996 with FC KAMAZ-Chally Naberezhnye Chelny: 2 games.

References

External links
 Legionnaires. As it was. 1992. Dynamo Kyiv. ua-football.com
 
 

1969 births
Footballers from Moscow
Living people
Russian footballers
Soviet footballers
Russian expatriate footballers
Soviet Top League players
Soviet Second League players
Russian Premier League players
Ukrainian Premier League players
Ukrainian First League players
FC Dynamo Moscow players
FC Dynamo Kyiv players
FC Dynamo-2 Kyiv players
FC Metalist Kharkiv players
MFC Mykolaiv players
FC KAMAZ Naberezhnye Chelny players
Expatriate footballers in Ukraine
Russian expatriate sportspeople in Ukraine
Association football defenders